The 1977 NFL draft was the procedure by which National Football League teams selected amateur college football players. It is officially known as the NFL Annual Player Selection Meeting. The draft was held May 3–4, 1977, at the Roosevelt Hotel in New York City, New York. The league also held its first supplemental draft, which took place after the regular draft and before the regular season.

This was the first draft in the common draft era (since 1967) to be 12 rounds, five rounds fewer than drafts of 1967–1976. The draft remained at 12 rounds through 1992 before being reduced to seven, where it has remained through 2022.

The draft began with commissioner Pete Rozelle dedicating a moment of silence to California Golden Bears quarterback Joe Roth, one of the most electric passers in college football who was eligible for the 1977 draft. He died in February from skin cancer at the age of 21.

With the first overall pick of the draft, the Tampa Bay Buccaneers selected running back Ricky Bell.

Player selections

Round One

Round Two

Round Three

Round Four

Round Five

Round Six

Round Seven

Round Eight

Round Nine

Round Ten

Round Eleven

Round Twelve

Hall of Famers
Tony Dorsett, running back from Pittsburgh, taken 1st round 2nd overall by Dallas Cowboys
Inducted: Professional Football Hall of Fame class of 1994.
Tony Dungy, safety from Minnesota, undrafted and signed by Pittsburgh Steelers
Inducted: For his Head Coaching achievements Professional Football Hall of Fame class of 2016.
Joe Klecko, defensive tackle from Temple, taken 6th round 144th overall by New York Jets
Inducted: Professional Football Hall of Fame Class of 2023.

Notable undrafted players

References

External links
 NFL.com – 1977 Draft
 databaseFootball.com – 1977 Draft
 Pro Football Hall of Fame

National Football League Draft
NFL Draft
Draft
NFL Draft
NFL Draft
American football in New York City
1970s in Manhattan
Sporting events in New York City
Sports in Manhattan